Multiscale European Soil Information System (MEUSIS) is based on local, regional, national and European Soil Data sets. On the one hand, the high geographical variability of soil and the close interface between the soil status and the local conditions require the soil information and assessment criteria to have a strong built-in local element. On the other hand, soil issues have also a broader and wider dimension with global consequences.   
 
The major bottleneck of the assessment of the soil condition in Europe, based on already existing data, is the lack of comparable methodologies for soil survey, digital soil mapping, monitoring and data transfer. There is a high variability of soil information in Europe, which also varies from country to country. Local, Regional and National Authorities are derailing with soil data; soil data sets from different countries are often implemented using different methodologies and measuring techniques.

External links
MEUSIS description
MEUSIS in Italy, SIAS Project

Pedology